John Mackay (born 24 November 1937) is an Australian cricketer. He played in 47 first-class matches for Queensland between 1959 and 1967.

See also
 List of Queensland first-class cricketers

References

External links
 

1937 births
Living people
Australian cricketers
Queensland cricketers
Sportspeople from Rockhampton
Cricketers from Queensland